Melapia is a genus of moths of the family Noctuidae. The genus was erected by Shigero Sugi in 1968.

Species
Melapia japonica (Ogata, 1961)
Melapia electaria (Bremer, 1864)

References

Catocalinae
Moth genera